Jupiter is a summer resort on the Romanian seacoast, on the Black Sea,  north of Mangalia.

Mangalia
Jupiter